The following is a list of public holidays in Armenia.

Legal holidays and remembrance days

Non-working legal holidays and remembrance days 
Per Armenian law, 12 days are declared as non-working days. Non-working days include:

Other legal holidays 
The following days are mentioned in relevant laws, but are not specified as non-working days:

Other traditional, international and professional holidays, as well as religious holidays, can also be celebrated in Armenia.  National minorities can also celebrate their national holidays.

Reshuffling by government 
The Government of Armenia is allowed to swap working and non-working days. It usually makes use of this e.g. declaring Easter Monday non-working, while the next Saturday becomes a working day instead.

Other memorable days 
On the fourth Sunday before 15 August (Dormition/Assumption), a special celebration called Vardavar (Վարդավար) takes place, where anyone is free to soak others with water from spray guns, hoses or even buckets.

See also
Public holidays in the Republic of Artsakh

Notes

 
Armenia
Armenian culture
Society of Armenia
Observances in Armenia
Holidays